Nabil Nahas (born 18 September 1949 in Beirut, Lebanon) is a Lebanese artist and painter living in New York.

Biography
Nabil grew up in Cairo and Beirut, before moving to the United States for college to study at Louisiana State University. He is the younger brother of the Lebanese/Brazilian businessman Naji Nahas. He earned a BFA in 1971 and an MFA from Yale University in 1973. Encounters with contemporary painters at Yale influenced Nahas to move to New York after graduation.

Painting career
He exhibited regularly at important New York galleries and received critical acclaim for his work. Usually working "in" an abstract idiom, Nahas repeatedly reinvented himself.

Nahas’ paintings have made use of geometric motifs and decorative patterns inspired Levantine art architecture. Nahas also employs traditional Western abstract painting, pointillistic and impressionistic techniques. Sometimes he combines these traditions in brightly colored paintings, suggestive of the richness of nature and of the imagination. One of Nahas’ motifs is starfish, sometimes cast in acrylic paint, on top of which he layered high-chroma acrylic paint.

In his most recent work, Nahas introduced recognizable Lebanese cedar, pine and olive trees in his most direct references yet to his native land. In 2018, Nahas was commissioned to produce a cedar painting to be featured on a new stamp in Lebanon.

Exhibition history

Solo exhibitions 

 1973 Yale University, Connecticut
 1977 Ohio State University, Ohio
 1978 Robert Miller Gallery, New York
 1979 Robert Miller Gallery, New York
 1980 Robert Miller Gallery, New York
 1987 Holly Solomon Gallery, New York
 1988 Galerie Montenay, Paris
 1988 Holly Solomon Gallery, New York
 1994 Baldwin Gallery, Aspen, Colorado
 1997 Sperone Westwater, New York
 1998 Baumgartner Galleries, Washington, DC
 1998 Milleventi, Milan
 1999 Sperone Westwater, New York
 2002 25th Bienal De São Paulo
 2002 J. Johnson Gallery, Jacksonville Beach, Florida
 2005 Galerie Xippas, Paris
 2005 Sperone Westwater, New York
 2009 Galerie Tanit, Munich, Germany
 2010 FIAF Gallery, New York
 2010 Beirut Exhibition Center (BEC), Beirut, Lebanon
 2011 Lawrie Shabibi Gallery, Dubai, United Arab Emirates
 2011 Ben Brown Fine Arts, London, England
 2013 Sperone Westwater
 2013 Lawrie Shabibi, Dubai, UAE
 2014 Ben Brown Fine Arts, London
 2016 Saleh Barakat Gallery, Beirut, Lebanon
2019 Saleh Barakat Gallery, Beirut, Lebanon

References

1949 births
Lebanese painters
Living people
Artists from Beirut